Baring may refer to one of the following

People
 Baring (surname)
 Baring family

German-British Baring family
 Family Name of the Earl of Cromer
 Family Name of the Baron & Earl of Northbrook
 Family Name of the Baron Ashburton
 Family Name of the Baron Howick of Glendale
 Family Name of the Baron Revelstoke

Places

 Baring, Victoria, Australia
 Baring, Saskatchewan, Canada
 Cape Baring, Northwest Territories, Canada
 Baring, Missouri, US
 Baring, Washington, US
 Baring Plantation, Maine, US
 Båring, Denmark

Banks
 Barings LLC, the successor of Barings Bank
 Barings Bank, a bank created in 1762 and closed in 1995
 Baring Private Equity Asia, an Asian private equity firm

Ships
Baring (1801 Indiaman), a merchant vessel of the East India Company, later a convict transport
Baring (1809 ship), a merchant vessel

Other uses
 Baring Road

See also
Sabine Baring-Gould (1834–1924), English antiquarian and writer
William S. Baring-Gould (1913–1967), Sherlock Holmes scholar
William Baring du Pré (1875–1946), British Conservative MP
Bearing (disambiguation)
Bering (disambiguation)